Hallie Sargisson (January 1, 1907 – February 9, 2010) was an American politician who served in the Iowa House of Representatives from the 24th district from 1971 to 1973.

She died on February 9, 2010, in Sioux City, Iowa at age 103.

References

1907 births
2010 deaths
Democratic Party members of the Iowa House of Representatives
American centenarians
20th-century American politicians
20th-century American women politicians
Women centenarians
21st-century American women
People from Woodbury County, Iowa